Laura Glauser (born 20 August 1993) is a French handballer for CSM București  and the French national team.

Achievements
IHF Junior World Championship:
Silver Medalist: 2012
IHF Youth World Championship:
Fourth Place: 2010
French Championship:
Winner: 2011, 2013, 2014, 2016, 2017, 2018
EHF Cup:
Finalist: 2013
EHF Cup Winners' Cup:
Semifinalist: 2011
Winner: 2011, 2013, 2014
French Cup:
Winner: 2013, 2015
French League Cup:
Winner: 2011, 2014
Hungarian Championship
Winner: 2022

Individual awards
 Best goalkeeper of the IHF Junior World Championship: 2012
 Best Young Goalkeeper at the 2015 World Championships
French Championship Best Goalkeeper: 2016, 2017
 All-Star Goalkeeper of the EHF Champions League: 2022

References

External links

1993 births
Living people
Sportspeople from Besançon
French female handball players
Olympic handball players of France
Olympic medalists in handball
Olympic silver medalists for France
Medalists at the 2016 Summer Olympics
Handball players at the 2016 Summer Olympics
European champions for France
Expatriate handball players
French expatriate sportspeople in Hungary
Győri Audi ETO KC players